National Secondary Route 215, or just Route 215 (or ) is a National Road Route of Costa Rica, located in the San José province.

Description
In San José province the route covers San José canton (Hospital, Catedral, Zapote districts), Curridabat canton (Curridabat district).

References

Highways in Costa Rica